, is the main football (soccer) competition for universities across Japan. Since 2013, the competition is held with 24 participating university teams. The competition was for the first time held on 1953, with the aim of opening the door to regional and lower-ranked university teams that did not have the opportunity to compete at the national level. The competition works similarly to the Japanese Regional Football Champions League, with the best teams from each region qualifying to the main tournament. University teams can only qualify for the Emperor's Cup through prefectural qualification, in where they need to face senior football clubs in order to qualify for it. With it stated, the All Japan University Championship does not qualify the winning team for any other competition, but it is of major relevance among the University football players. The championship is organized by the Japan Football Association and the Japan University Football Association.

High schools and university teams are highly evaluated in Japan. Although the High School championship gets a large amount of spotlight away from the university football, many national team players have played at the competition, or have played for university teams through their youth careers. A recent example is Kaoru Mitoma, who studied and played for University of Tsukuba until 2019, who also stated the university studies and football structure helped him to prepare for professional football. Most of the players at each edition of the competition, after graduating from their respectives universities, most likely goes on to pursue a career on football, either being it at professional or regional level.

Past winners
Past winners are:

References

See also
All Japan Women's University Football Championship

Football competitions in Japan
Youth football competitions
Youth football in Japan
Recurring sporting events established in 1953